Be Ready Boys: Appalachia to Abilene is an album by the American musicians Norman Blake and Rich O'Brien, released in 1999.

Track listing 
 "Tennessee Wagoner" (Traditional) – 3:22
 "Old Pal of Yesterday" (W. S. Stevenson) – 4:29
 "Texola Waltz" (Blake) – 2:23
 "When It's Lamplighting Time in the Valley" (Traditional) – 3:37
 "Bowling Green Rag" (Blake) – 2:33
 "Homestead on the Farm" (A. P. Carter) – 3:30
 "Mexico" (Bryant) – 2:25
 "Going Home" (Antonín Dvořák, Traditional) – 3:39
 "Kentucky's Your Home" (Blake) – 3:14
 "Under the Double Eagle" (Traditional) – 4:08
 "Grandpa's Barn" (Richard O'Brien) – 4:25
 "Seamus O'Brien" (Traditional) – 3:45
 "Flop-Eared Mule" (Traditional) – 4:05
 "A Maiden's Prayer" (Bob Wills) – 3:32
 "Callahan" (Traditional) – 2:13
 "Heavenly Sunlight" (G. H. Cook, H. J. Zelley) – 3:45

Personnel
Norman Blake – guitar, banjo, fiddle, vocals
Rich O'Brien – guitar, mandolin, vocals
Don Edwards – guitar

1999 albums
Norman Blake (American musician) albums